Immortals is the eighth studio album by Greek heavy metal band Firewind. It is the only album to feature new vocalist Henning Basse and the final album by the band to have longtime keyboardist Bob Katsionis before he departed in 2020. It was released on 20 January 2017 in Europe.

Track listing 
All lyrics by Dennis Ward. All music by Gus G., except where noted.

Personnel
 Henning Basse – lead vocals
 Gus G. – lead guitar
 Petros Christodoulidis – bass
 Bob Katsionis – keyboards, rhythm guitar
 Johan Nunez – drums

Charts

References

2017 albums
Firewind albums
Century Media Records albums
Albums produced by Dennis Ward (musician)